Andy Williams is an American football coach.	He was the interim head football coach at the Washburn University in Topeka, Kansas for two games during the 1993 season,  compiling a record of  0–2.

Head coaching record

Notes

References

Year of birth missing (living people)
Living people
American football quarterbacks
Missouri Western Griffons football coaches
Missouri Western Griffons football players
Utah State Aggies football coaches
Washburn Ichabods football coaches
Junior college football coaches in the United States